Pausa is a town in the Vogtlandkreis district, in the Free State of Saxony, Germany. It is situated 13 km east of Schleiz, and 14 km northwest of Plauen. With effect from 1 January 2013, it has merged with Mühltroff under the name of Pausa-Mühltroff.

References 

Former municipalities in Saxony